Four Seasons Hotel, Mumbai is a five-star hotel and part of the Toronto-based Four Seasons luxury hotels and resorts. It is located in the emerging district of Worli, Mumbai. The hotel currently houses 202 guest rooms, and also offers India's highest rooftop bar, Aer.

History 
The 33-storey building was completed in 2008, and  designed by John Arzarian of Lohan Associates, a Hong Kong-based company. The hotel's interior was designed by Bilkey-Linas.
The civil construction of the building was completed in one and a half years with a slab cycle of 8 days. The 37-storey tower was completed in less than a year, making it one of the fastest constructions of such buildings in India. The project was managed by Mr. Sanjiv Garg, General Manager of Ahluwalia Contracts (I) Ltd., a New Delhi-based construction company.

Restaurants 
The following restaurants are available at the hotel:
Café Prato & Bar 
Pool Deck
San-Qi

References

External links 
 

Four Seasons hotels and resorts
Hotels established in 2008
Hotel buildings completed in 2008
Skyscraper hotels in Mumbai